Min Na-on (born 5 November 1988) is a South Korean professional golfer who has played on the LPGA Tour.

Min won the Sun City Nedbank Challenge as an amateur in 2002 and turned professional after earning non-exempt status on the LPGA Tour at the 2006 LPGA Final Qualifying Tournament. Her highest finish was third place in the 2007 LPGA Championship, a major championship on the Tour.

Results in LPGA majors

CUT = missed the half-way cut
"T" = tied

Source:

LPGA Tour career summary

Official as of the 2012 season. Sources:

References

South Korean female golfers
LPGA Tour golfers
1988 births
Living people